Manuel José de Frutos-Huerta  (1811–1873) was a New Zealand trader. A Spaniard from Valverde del Majano in Segovia, he arrived to New Zealand around 1833 and lived much of his life as a trader among the Māori people; he is described possessing Germanic features: pale skin, red hair, and green eyes. He retired to Tikapa on the Waiapu River.

He was married to five Ngāti Porou women, and has thousands of living descendants.

The 2014 play "Paniora" by Briar Grace-Smith was inspired by his legacy.

References

External links
 Otros documentales - El clan español de Nueva Zelanda . Documentary hosted by RTVE.

1873 deaths
People from Segovia
New Zealand traders
Spanish emigrants to New Zealand
1811 births